Pozdeyevskaya is a rural locality (a village) in Tiginskoye Rural Settlement, Vozhegodsky District, Vologda Oblast, Russia. The population was 21 as of 2002.

Geography 
Pozdeyevskaya is located 51 km northwest of Vozhega (the district's administrative centre) by road. Zavrag is the nearest rural locality.

References 

Rural localities in Vozhegodsky District